Yiman may refer to:
 Yiman people, an ethnic group of Australia
 Yiman language, a language of Australia
 Dalnerechensk, formerly known as Yiman, a town in eastern Russia
 a Chinese given name, people with this name include:
 Zhang Yiman, badminton player
 Zhao Yiman, resistance fighter

See also 
 Yimen
 Iman (disambiguation)

Language and nationality disambiguation pages